A genius is a person who has exceptional intellectual ability, creativity, or originality.

Genius may also refer to:

Arts and entertainment

Film, television and radio
The Genius (1948 film), a Mexican comedy film
Genius (1991 film), a Russian drama
Genius (1999 film), a Disney Channel Original Movie
Genius (2012 film), a Telugu film
Genius (2016 film), a biographical drama about Max Perkins
Genius (2018 Hindi film), an Indian action thriller
Genius (2018 Tamil film), an Indian drama film
Genius (radio series), a British comedy gameshow 2005–08 
Genius (British series), a TV version of the radio show 2009–10
Genius (American TV series), an anthology period drama from 2017
The Genius (TV series), a South Korean reality game show
Genius by Stephen Hawking, a 2016 TV documentary series

Literature
Genius (literature), a concept in literary theory relating to inspiration
The "Genius" (novel), by Theodore Dreiser, 1915
The Genius, a 2008 novel by Jesse Kellerman
"The Genius", a 1955 short story by Randall Garrett as Ivar Jorgensen
"The Genius", a story by Donald Barthelme in his 1987 collection Forty Stories
Genius: The Life and Science of Richard Feynman, a 1992 biography by James Gleick

Music
Genius (Krizz Kaliko album), 2009
Genius: The Best of Warren Zevon, a 2002 album
"Genius" (LSD song), 2018
"Genius" (Pitchshifter song), 1997
"Genius", a 2021 song by Pop Smoke from the album Faith

Other uses in arts and entertainment
Genius (comics), a Scottish newspaper cartoon series 1978–1983
Geniu$: The Tech Tycoon Game, a 2005 computer game
Genius, a fictional character in TV sitcom Herman's Head

Businesses
Genius Brands International, an American entertainment company
Genius Products, or Genius Entertainment, a former American entertainment company
Genius (company), an American digital media company
Micro Genius, a brand name of Famicom clone consoles in several countries
Genius mouse, a brand name of computer peripherals manufactured abroad by Taiwanese manufacturer KYE Systems
TV Genius, a British software company
Genius Bar, a tech support station in Apple's retail stores

Mythology
Genius (mythology), the divine element of a person, place or thing
Genius loci, the protective spirit of a place
The emperor's genius, an element of the ancient Roman Imperial cult

People
The Genius, or GZA (Gary E. Grice (born 1967), an American rapper 
The Genius, a nickname of musician Ray Charles (1930–2004)
The Genius, a ring name of wrestler Lanny Poffo

Science and technology
Genius (iTunes), an Apple software feature 
Genius (mathematics software), a numerical computing environment and programming language

See also

 Genie (disambiguation)
 Genii (disambiguation)
 Evil genius (disambiguation)
 Mastermind (disambiguation)
 Gaon (Hebrew), literally 'genius'
 Geniusze, a village in Poland
 MacArthur Fellows Program, commonly known as a "Genius grant"